Common names: shield tail snakes, earth snakes.

Rhinophis is a genus of nonvenomous shield tail snakes found in Sri Lanka and South India. Currently, 24 species (with no subspecies) are recognized in this genus. Of the 24 species, 18 are endemic to Sri Lanka, while six are endemic to South India.

Geographic range
Found mainly in Sri Lanka and also in southern India. In Sri Lanka, this genus also occurs in low plains in the dry zone.

Species

) Not including the nominate subspecies.
T) Type species.

References

External links

 
 Aengals, R.; S. R. Ganesh 2013. Rhinophis goweri — A New Species of Shieldtail Snake from the Southern Eastern Ghats, India. Russ. J. Herpetol. 20 (1): 61-65.
 Ganesh, S. R. 2015. Shieldtail snakes (Reptilia: Uropeltidae)– the Darwin's finches of south Indian snake fauna? Manual on Identification and Preparation of Keys of Snakes with Special Reference to their Venomous Nature in India., Govt. Arts College, Ooty, 13-24.
 Pyron, R. A., Ganesh, S. R., Sayyed, A., Sharma, V., Wallach, V., & Somaweera, R. 2016. A catalogue and systematic overview of the shield-tailed snakes (Serpentes: Uropeltidae). Zoosystema, 38(4), 453-506.

 
Snake genera
Snakes of Asia
Taxa named by Wilhelm Hemprich